Marienberg Rural LLG (also Marienberg Hills Rural LLG) is a local-level government (LLG) of East Sepik Province, Papua New Guinea. The Marienberg languages are spoken in this LLG, as well as various Lower Sepik-Ramu languages and the isolate Tayap.

Wards
01. Kasmin 2 (Buna language speakers)
02. Kasmin 1 (Buna language speakers)
03. Mansep
04. Ariapan (Buna language speakers)
05. Boik (Buna language speakers)
06. Kis
07. Kaup
08. Murik (Nor language speakers)
09. Darapap
10. Karau
11. Mendam
12. Bin
13. Suk (Buna language speakers)
14. Imbandomarienberg
15. Mamber
16. Watam (Marangis language speakers)
17. Kopar (Kopar language speakers)
18. Mabuk
19. Gapun (Tayap language speakers)
20. Arango
21. Ombos
22. Ormai
23. Jangit
24. Manimong
25. Murken
26. Pokran
27. Jeta
28. Binam
29. Pankin

See also
Marienberg, Papua New Guinea
Marienberg Hills
Marienberg languages

References

Local-level governments of East Sepik Province